Yameiry Infante Honoret (born March 19, 1985), known in show business as La Materialista, is a Dominican singer, songwriter, rapper, actress and model.

In 2011, she was elected by Luz García's Noche de Luz programme as a "Summer's Hot Body".

La Materialista was the leading female exponent of the Dominican urban music in the early 2000s, winning the Q Award for "Best Urban Artist" (2012) and "Best Video Clip" (2013); she has also been nominated for the Soberano Award on several occasions as "Best New Artist" and "Urban Group of the Year".

In 2013, she became the first Dominican female artist to perform at Miss Venezuela.

Plagiarism allegations 
In 2013, Honoret was accused of plagiarising the Korean girl group 2NE1's song "I Am the Best" with her newly released track "Chipi Cha Cha". The music video was removed from YouTube after extensive allegations in the comments, and it was re-uploaded in 2015 under the guise of a cover.

Honoret responded to the allegations, saying, "Sorry, I didn't think you would feel bad for me it was an honor making a cover of the song with my lyrics."

Discography

Studio albums
 A Otro Nivel

Filmography

References

External links

21st-century Dominican Republic women singers
Dominican Republic film actresses
Dominican Republic female models
Dominican Republic people of French descent
Dominican Republic people of Spanish descent
People from Santiago Province (Dominican Republic)
White Dominicans
1985 births
Living people
Dominican Republic women rappers